is a railway station in the city of Katagami, Akita Prefecture, Japan, operated by East Japan Railway Company (JR East).

Lines
Kamifutada Station is a station of the Oga Line and is located 8.3 rail kilometers from the terminus of the line at Oiwake Station and 21.3 kilometers from

Station layout
The station has a single island platform, connected to the station building by a footbridge. The station is unattended.

Platforms

History
Futada Station opened on November 26, 1956 as a station on the Japan National Railway (JNR), serving the village of Tennō, Akita. With the privatization of JNR on April 1, 1987, the station has been managed by JR East.

Surrounding area
 Katagami City Hall
Michi-no-eki Tennō

See also
 List of railway stations in Japan

External links

JR East station information page 

Railway stations in Japan opened in 1956
Railway stations in Akita Prefecture
Oga Line
Katagami, Akita